The 741st Aircraft Control and Warning Squadron is an inactive United States Air Force unit. It was last assigned to the 31st Air Division, Aerospace Defense Command, stationed at Lackland Air Force Base, Texas. It was inactivated on 31 December 1969.

The unit was a General Surveillance Radar squadron providing for the air defense of the United States.

Lineage
 Activated as 741st Aircraft Control and Warning Squadron, 1 February 1953
 Inactivated on 1 December 1969

Assignments
 33d Air Division, 1 February 1953
 Oklahoma City Air Defense Sector, 1 January 1960
 4752d Air Defense Wing, 1 September 1961
 Oklahoma City Air Defense Sector, 25 June 1963
 31st Air Division, 1 April 1966 – 31 December 1969

Stations
 Lackland AFB, Texas, 1 February 1953 – 1 December 1969

References

  A Handbook of Aerospace Defense Organization 1946 - 1980,  by Lloyd H. Cornett and Mildred W. Johnson, Office of History, Aerospace Defense Center, Peterson Air Force Base, Colorado
 Winkler, David F. (1997), Searching the skies: the legacy of the United States Cold War defense radar program. Prepared for United States Air Force Headquarters Air Combat Command.

External links

Radar squadrons of the United States Air Force
Aerospace Defense Command units
1953 establishments in Texas
1969 disestablishments in Texas